Eric James Stamets (born September 25, 1991) is an American professional baseball shortstop who is a free agent. He has played in Major League baseball (MLB) for the Cleveland Indians.

Career

Amateur
Stamets is a resident of Dublin, Ohio, where he attended Dublin Scioto High School. Stamets attended the University of Evansville and played college baseball for the Evansville Purple Aces. In 2010, his freshman year, he was named a Freshman All-American. In 2011, he played collegiate summer baseball with the Hyannis Harbor Hawks of the Cape Cod Baseball League and was named a league all-star. As a junior in 2012, he had a .316 batting average, which led the team, and was named the Missouri Valley Conference's defensive player of the year.

Los Angeles Angels of Anaheim
The Los Angeles Angels of Anaheim selected Stamets in the sixth round, with the 207th overall selection, of the 2012 MLB Draft. The Angels assigned him to the Cedar Rapids Kernels of the Class A Midwest League after he signed. He played for the Inland Empire 66ers of San Bernardino of the Class A-Advanced California League in 2013. Stamets played for the Arkansas Travelers of the Class AA Texas League in 2014 and 2015.

Cleveland Indians
On July 28, 2015, the Angels traded Stamets to the Cleveland Indians for David Murphy. He played for the Akron RubberDucks of the Class AA Eastern League following the trade. The Indians invited Stamets to spring training in 2016. In 2016, Stamets played for Akron, batting .258 in 69 games, and the Columbus Clippers of the Class AAA International League, batting .164 in 22 games. He began the 2017 season with Akron and was promoted to Columbus, and he played in the Triple-A All-Star Game. He batted .259 with 16 home runs and 52 RBIs in 116 games. The Indians added Stamets to their 40-man roster following the 2017 season. In 2018, he missed the first 25 games with a back injury.

Stamets made Cleveland's Opening Day roster in 2019, filling in at shortstop for Francisco Lindor, who started the season on the injured list. He made his major league debut on March 28, 2019. Stamets was designated for assignment on July 31, 2019. After clearing waivers, Stamets was outrighted to the minor leagues on August 6, 2019. He became a free agent following the 2019 season.

Colorado Rockies
Stamets signed a minor league contract, with an invitation to major league spring training, with the Colorado Rockies on November 12, 2019. He resigned on a minor league deal on November 2, 2020. Stamets appeared in 40 games with the Rookie-League ACL Rockies and Triple-A Albuquerque Isotopes, hitting .168 with 4 home runs and 9 RBI's. On August 27, 2021, Stamets was released by the Rockies.

Toronto Blue Jays
On March 4, 2022, Stamets signed a minor league contract with the Toronto Blue Jays. He was released on August 13, 2022. On September 4, 2022, Stamets resigned a minor league deal with the Toronto Blue Jays. He elected free agency on November 10, 2022.

References

External links

1991 births
Living people
People from Dublin, Ohio
Baseball players from Ohio
Major League Baseball shortstops
Cleveland Indians players
Evansville Purple Aces baseball players
Hyannis Harbor Hawks players
Cedar Rapids Kernels players
Inland Empire 66ers of San Bernardino players
Arkansas Travelers players
Mesa Solar Sox players
Akron RubberDucks players
Columbus Clippers players
Arizona Complex League Rockies players
Buffalo Bisons (minor league) players